MDV is a joint venture television station between Seven West Media and WIN Corporation.  Based in Mildura, Victoria, Australia, it is a digital-only Network 10 affiliate run under the company name Mildura Digital Television Pty Ltd, and began broadcasting on 1 January 2006. On 1 July 2016, due to WIN Television becoming the Network Ten affiliate in the region, MDV switched its affiliation to the Nine Network and remained there until 2021. On 1 July 2021, due to WIN Television becoming the Nine Network affiliate in the region, MDV switched back its affiliation to Network 10.

Availability
The station is a Network 10 affiliate, which is jointly owned by Seven West Media and WIN Television. MDV is available on LCN 5 in the Mildura and Sunraysia area in standard-definition.

10's multichannels 10 HD (which is 10's main channel in high definition), as well as 10 Bold and 10 Peach are available on LCN 50, LCN 51 and LCN 52 respectively. Before the 2021 affiliation swapback, Nine's multichannels 9Gem (in high definition) and 9Go! were available on LCN 50 and LCN 55 respectively. Before MDV's affiliation change on 1 July 2016, Ten's multichannels One and Eleven were available on LCN 50 and LCN 55 respectively.

WIN is responsible for handling playout and then transmits this signal via satellite to transmission facilities in Mildura. WIN also handles the business administration and advertising sales for MDV.

The Mildura/Sunraysia region changed frequencies as part of a nationwide retune process on 26 August 2014, and the station moved from UHF 33 to VHF 10 as a result of the retune.

See also 
 DTD (TV station)
 TDT (TV station)

References

Mildura
Joint ventures
Digital terrestrial television in Australia
Television channels and stations established in 2006
WIN Television
Prime Media Group
Seven Network
2006 establishments in Australia